Shizhou is a historic township located in the middle north of Yanling County, Hunan, China; it was merged to Miandu Town in November 2015.

Subdivisions
The township is divided into 7 villages, the following areas: Shiba Village, Qingshi Village, Ankeng Village, Shuangjiang Village, Dayuan Village, Ma'ao Village, and Gaoche Village.

References

Historic township-level divisions of Yanling County